

Hosts

By event

1960 Winter Olympics

1992 Winter Olympics

1994 Winter Olympics

1998 Winter Olympics

References

 Viem hong hat dated March 20, 2019

External links
InBaseline
1992 Winter Olympics
1994 Winter Olympics
1998 Winter Olympics

CBS Sports
CBS